Yuri Ozerov may refer to:

 Yuri Ozerov (director) (1921–2001), Soviet film director
 Yuri Ozerov (basketball) (1928-2004), Soviet basketball player

See also
For other people with the same surname, see Ozerov